Lipstick Jungle is an American comedy-drama television series created by DeAnn Heline and Eileen Heisler that aired on NBC from February 7, 2008, to January 9, 2009. The series was produced by NBC Universal Television Studio (now Universal Media Studios). The hour-long series was based on the best-selling novel of the same name by Candace Bushnell, who also served as executive producer alongside showrunner/head writer Oliver Goldstick. The pilot was directed by Gary Winick.

Plot

Lipstick Jungle is a dramedy following the professional and personal lives of three best friends, all of whom are top professionals in their respective careers.  Victory Ford (Lindsay Price) is a fashion designer, Nico Reilly (Kim Raver) is the editor-in-chief of Bonfire magazine, and Wendy Healy (Brooke Shields) is the former president of Parador Pictures, currently producing independently.  These three powerful women are always there to support one another and navigate the crazy, romantic, and sometimes scary world that is New York City.

Production
The cast initially included Gina Gershon as Wendy Healy, Kim Raver as Nico Reilly, Will Toale as Shane Healy, and Robert Buckley as Kirby Atwood, with Matthew Morrison, Scott Cohen, and Edward Herrmann also attached. The show underwent significant changes, though, with all the aforementioned cast being replaced and with executive producers DeAnn Heline and Eileen Heisler, writers Rand Ravich and Jill Gordon, and director Nigel Cole all fired. George had been personally cast by Bushnell, but left in early 2007 when she was offered the HBO series In Treatment.

The show premiered on February 7, 2008. as a midseason replacement taking over ER spot at 10:00 pm Eastern/9:00 pm Central. The series was slated to have 13 episodes per season, but due to the 2007–2008 Writers Guild of America strike, only seven episodes were originally produced for the first season. The first season also competed indirectly with ABC's Cashmere Mafia, created by Bushnell's former creative partner from Sex and the City, Darren Star.

On February 24, 2008, NBC ordered six additional scripts of Lipstick Jungle. On April 2, 2008, NBC renewed Lipstick Jungle for a second season when they announced their fall 2008 lineup. The second season premiered on September 24, airing at 10:00 pm Eastern/9:00 pm Central on Wednesdays. One month later, NBC announced that Lipstick Jungle would move to Fridays at 10:00 pm Eastern/9:00 pm Central effective October 31, 2008.

On November 13, 2008, rumors emerged that NBC would cancel the show due to low ratings, but whether the remaining episodes would be aired in the current time slot was unclear. On November 21, 2008, NBC moved Lipstick Jungle to Fridays at an hour earlier, 9:00 pm Eastern/8:00 pm Central beginning December 5, for the remainder of the season.

On January 9, 2009, the last produced episode of Lipstick Jungle aired, and it was advertised as the season finale. On January 15, 2009,  the show was announced as not yet cancelled, and could be brought back for episodes based on how the new pilots were received. On January 27, 2009, NBC announced that the show would get the "Friday Night Lights treatment", implying that the show will return on another of NBC Universal's networks for a third season and then replay on NBC midseason.

On February 25, 2009, the future of Lipstick Jungle was once again put in limbo when NBC announced that Lindsay Price was cast in the pilot for ABC's new drama Eastwick. Had Lipstick Jungle received an official third-season pick-up from NBC, though, Price would have pulled out of Eastwick  fulfill her contractual obligation to Lipstick Jungle.
On March 28, 2009, Entertainment Weekly reported that the show was officially canceled.

Cast and characters

Main characters
 Brooke Shields as Wendy Healy
 Kim Raver as Nico Reilly
 Lindsay Price as Victory Ford
 Paul Blackthorne as Shane Healy
 Andrew McCarthy as Joe Bennett
 Robert Buckley as Kirby Atwood (Recurring in Season 1; Main in Season 2)

Recurring characters
 Lorraine Bracco as Janice Lasher (season one)
 David Noroña as Salvador
 Rosie Perez as Dahlia Morales (season two)
 David Alan Basche as Mike Harness
 Mary Tyler Moore as Joyce Connor (season two)
 Matt Lauria as Roy Merritt
 James Lesure as Griffin Bell (season two)
 Vanessa Marcil as Josie Scotto (season two)
 Sarah Hyland as Maddie Healy 
 Carlos Ponce as Rodrigo Vega (season two)
 Julian Sands as Hector Matrick (season one)

Episodes

Season one: 2008

Season two: 2008-2009

UK ratings
Below is a table of ratings for UK digital channel Living, the network showing Lipstick Jungle.

Season one
Season one of Lipstick Jungle began airing on September 22, 2008, on Mondays at 10 pm, following one of Living's most popular US acquisitions  America's Next Top Model. The network soon brought in a name for their Monday night schedule, 'I Heart NY Mondays', as both shows are set in New York.

Season two
The second season of the show began airing immediately after the first run's seven episodes had finished.

Home media

International distribution
The series was broadcast on Living in the UK,  TG4 in the Republic of Ireland, Domashniy in Russia, and 7 Network in Australia.  CTV Television Network aired the show in Canada, and broadcast by TV3 in New Zealand.

References

External links

2008 American television series debuts
2009 American television series endings
2000s American comedy-drama television series
2000s American romantic comedy television series
English-language television shows
Fashion-themed television series
NBC original programming
Television series by Universal Television
Television shows set in New York City